Anzio (Italian: Lo sbarco di Anzio), also known as The Battle for Anzio (UK title), is a 1968 Technicolor war film in Panavision, an Italian and American co-production, about Operation Shingle, the 1944 Allied seaborne assault on the Italian port of Anzio in World War II. It was adapted from the book Anzio by Wynford Vaughan-Thomas, who had been the BBC war correspondent at the battle.

The film stars Robert Mitchum, Peter Falk, and a variety of international film stars, who mostly portray fictitious characters based on actual participants in the battle. The two exceptions were Wolfgang Preiss and Tonio Selwart, who respectively played Field Marshal Albert Kesselring and General Eberhard von Mackensen. The film was made in Italy with an Italian film crew and produced by Italian producer Dino De Laurentiis; however, none of the main cast were Italian, nor were there any major Italian characters. The film was jointly directed by Edward Dmytryk and Duilio Coletti.

In the English-language version, Italians speak their native language. German military commanders  speak English.

Plot
After meeting a general, war correspondent Dick Ennis is assigned to accompany US Army Rangers for the upcoming attempt to outflank the tough enemy defenses. The amphibious landing is unopposed, but the bumbling American general, Jack Lesley, is too cautious, preferring to fortify his beachhead before advancing inland. Ennis and a Ranger drive in a jeep through the countryside, discovering there are few Germans between the beachhead and Rome, but his information is ignored. As a result, the German commander, Kesselring, has time to gather his forces and launch an effective counterattack.

Ennis is with the Rangers who are ambushed at the Battle of Cisterna. From there, the film departs from being a view of all sides and levels of the campaign to a story of a handful of survivors making their way back through enemy lines. The men take shelter in a house occupied by three Italian women. A German patrol arrives at the house, only to be slaughtered by the Americans. Ennis asks what makes one human being willingly kill another. Corporal Jack Rabinoff replies that he loves it, and his lifestyle makes him live more than anyone else.

Having almost reached friendly lines, most of the men, including Rabinoff, are killed in a shootout with a group of German snipers. It is during this shootout that Ennis is finally forced to kill one of the Germans with Rabinoff's gun. Only Ennis, Technical Sergeant Stimmler and Private Movie make it back and deliver intelligence about the Germans' new defense line. The film ends with Ennis publicly questioning the competence of the Allied commanders and man's willingness to kill each other.

Cast

 Robert Mitchum as Dick Ennis, war correspondent
 Peter Falk as Corporal Jack Rabinoff
 Robert Ryan as Lieutenant General Carson
 Earl Holliman as Technical Sergeant Abe Stimmler
 Mark Damon as Private Wally Richardson
 Arthur Kennedy as Major General Jack Lesley (loosely based on John P. Lucas)
 Wolfgang Preiss as Generalfeldmarschall Albert Kesselring
 Reni Santoni as Private Movie
 Joseph Walsh as Private Doyle
 Thomas Hunter as Private Andy
 Giancarlo Giannini as Private Cellini
 Wayde Preston as Colonel Hendricks
 Arthur Franz as Major General Luke Howard
 Anthony Steel as Major-General Marsh
 Patrick Magee as Major-General Starkey
Venantino Venantini as Captain Burns

Response
The film opened to mixed reviews in the US; many felt it did not work as well as Dmytryk's early war films. The New York Times film review was generally dismissive, and describes the film as "a very ordinary war movie with an epic title, produced by Dino De Laurentiis, the Italian producer... who thinks big but often produces small".  In contrast, Chicago Sun-Times critic Roger Ebert had a more favourable opinion of the film, described it as "a good war movie and even an intelligent one".

Production
Riz Ortolani scored the film with a ballad called The World is Yours with lyrics by Doc Pomus that was sung beneath the credits by Jack Jones. Luigi Scaccianoce was the production designer.

Peter Falk thought that the script he read was clichéd and wanted off the film.  At the last minute, Dino De Laurentiis put Falk's name above the title billing and gave him his choice of writer for his character's dialogue.  Falk stayed and wrote his lines himself. The production saw De Laurentiis bring in for the first time another actor who made a debut, Giancarlo Giannini, who would later do international films and would work with director Lina Wertmüller.

Rabinoff is based on a real 1st Special Service Force soldier, Sgt John L. "Jake" Walkmeister, who ran an illegal brothel of Italian prostitutes in a stolen ambulance. Walkmeister was killed by shrapnel at Port Cros during Operation Dragoon, the invasion of southern France.

See also
List of American films of 1968

References

External links
 
 
 
 
 
 .
 .

1968 films
1968 war films
1960s English-language films
English-language Italian films
American war films
Italian Campaign of World War II films
Italian war films
Films directed by Edward Dmytryk
Films directed by Duilio Coletti
Columbia Pictures films
Films based on non-fiction books
War epic films
World War II films based on actual events
Films set in 1944
Macaroni Combat films
Films scored by Riz Ortolani
Films produced by Dino De Laurentiis
American World War II films
Italian World War II films
Anzio
1960s American films
1960s Italian films